The future perfect is a grammatical construction.

Future perfect can also refer to:
 Future Perfect (Autolux album) (2004)
 Future Perfect (Loadstar album) (2013)
 Future Perfect (video game), in development 
 Future Perfect (book), by Steven Johnson (2012)
 Futureperfect, a 2002 album by VNV Nation
 TimeSplitters Future Perfect, a 2005 video game developed by Free Radical Design
 Future Perfect, a Vox column launched in 2018 to cover topics from an effective altruism perspective

See also
 Future tense
 Perfect (grammar)
 Past Perfect Future Tense (Magne F. album)